Bittern is a town on the Mornington Peninsula in Melbourne, Victoria, Australia,  south-east of Melbourne's Central Business District, located within the Shire of Mornington Peninsula local government area. Bittern recorded a population of 4,276 at the 2021 census.

Bittern is part of an urban enclave on Western Port comprising Bittern, Hastings, Crib Point, Somerville, and Tyabb. It is served by Bittern railway station on the Stony Point greater-metropolitan line and by the 782 bus route operated by Peninsula Bus Lines between Frankston and Flinders. Bittern is named after the shy wetland bird, the Australasian bittern, which reflects the town's location amongst significant areas of native bushland and dense coastal vegetation.

History and Present Day

The town was part of the Coolart pastoral run of the 1860s. Bittern Post Office opened on 5 January 1891. The railway opened for Bittern in 1889 and small scale commercial development began during the early 1900s. The town also has a primary school, Bittern Primary School, and a small basketball and netball stadium known as Graham Myers Sports Stadium or Bittern Memorial Stadium, which features an indoor court used for basketball, netball or floorball and four outside courts used for netball. There is also a small oval located outside the stadium.

See also
 Shire of Hastings – Bittern was previously within this former local government area.

References

Suburbs of Melbourne
Mornington Peninsula
Western Port
Coastal towns in Victoria (Australia)